Mestolobes pyropa is a moth of the family Crambidae described by Edward Meyrick in 1899. It is endemic to the Hawaiian islands of Oahu and Molokai.

The larvae feed on Peperornia species, including Peperomia pachyphylla. It is thought they mine the leaves of their host plant. 

Adults have been taken at flowers of Hoya species.

External links

Crambinae
Moths described in 1899
Taxa named by Edward Meyrick
Endemic moths of Hawaii
Biota of Oahu
Biota of Molokai